The Junior women's race at the 1995 IAAF World Cross Country Championships was held in Durham, England, at the University of Durham on March 25, 1995. A report on the event was given in The New York Times and in the Glasgow Herald.

Complete results, medallists, 
 and the results of British athletes were published.

Race results

Junior women's race (4.47 km)

Individual

Teams

Note: Athletes in parentheses did not score for the team result

Participation
An unofficial count yields the participation of 108 athletes from 33 countries in the Junior women's race.  This is in agreement with the official numbers as published.

 (5)
 (1)
 (4)
 (6)
 (1)
 (4)
 (2)
 (1)
 (6)
 (1)
 (6)
 (1)
 (1)
 (6)
 (6)
 (1)
 (6)
 (1)
 (1)
 (1)
 (1)
 (6)
 (2)
 (1)
 (6)
 (6)
 (5)
 (4)
 (6)
 (6)
 (1)
 (1)
 (3)

See also
 1995 IAAF World Cross Country Championships – Senior men's race
 1995 IAAF World Cross Country Championships – Junior men's race
 1995 IAAF World Cross Country Championships – Senior women's race

References

Junior women's race at the World Athletics Cross Country Championships
IAAF World Cross Country Championships
1995 in women's athletics
1995 in youth sport